Jeanette Wilson (born ) is a self-proclaimed medium and spiritual healer who claims to heal people with the assistance of spirits. Wilson has been criticised for promoting New World Order theories, anti-vaccination views, unproven supplements, anti-5G claims, and dangerous COVID-19 health advice.

Early life and family
Wilson was born in the United Kingdom. She worked as a Lloyds Bank manager in the UK until she began working as a self-professed psychic healer and medium, following the death of her grandfather, who she claims contacted her after his death. She moved from the UK to New Zealand in 1999. Her partner and business partner is Andrew Carter and they live in Orewa in Auckland.

Mediumship and psychic healing
Wilson has said that she is able to communicate with several spirits, including at least one deceased surgeon, who help her to conduct spiritual healing. Her sessions include waving her hands, which she states are possessed by spirits, while humming, stomping, and clapping.

Wilson has stated that her psychic healing abilities include curing arthritis and the healing of vision impairments that require glasses. She has also stated that she has treated paralysis, blindness in one eye, and many cases of life-threatening cancer. Wilson has said she never discourages her clients from seeking medical care, however she has publicly discouraged her followers from seeking medical screening for breast cancer, stating "I'm not convinced about mammograms. I've had one myself but personally I wouldn't have another one. That isn't me telling you not to have them, but I know what it does to me and my body."

When asked whether curing people of medical conditions was accurate, Wilson replied "It is a fair representation of what I'm saying, but I never ever use the word cure, because that doesn't fit my framework of beliefs".

Accused serial sex abuser and debunked faith healer João Teixeira de Faria, AKA John of God, has been described as Wilson's mentor and she has said that they are both assisted in psychic healing by some of the same spirits. She refers her clients onto de Faria and her meditation techniques taught in workshops are from the 'Casa in Brazil'. She has described her claimed psychic abilities in the context of her Christianity, stating that they are a gift from God. She has stated that her psychic sessions always include the Lord's Prayer and the Hail Mary.

In June 2020, The Spinoff reported that Wilson had told audiences at a show in Chester England that a dead surgeon called Dr Augusto de Almeida was "working through her", and she was quoted as saying: "I wear white so that any energies taken off the patient, the recipients of the healing, don't contaminate my energy fields." The publication also reported that Wilson said "Imagine being able to open up everybody's heart centre. We don't need any more wars. We don't need any more vaccines. We don't need any more 5G."

Media coverage and public events
In 2004, Wilson was the subject of a New Zealand TV Channel Three series titled Dare to Believe. Later, she was featured on an episode of 20/20. She has written four books about her experiences as a professional medium and about other new age topics: Backstage with Jeanette Wilson, Medium Rare, Rare Moments and Dare to Believe: Explore Your Own Psychic Abilities.

Wilson has held public events in the UK and in New Zealand, as well as weekend workshops and psychic surgery sessions. She also conducts private consultations.

Anti-science and conspiratorial claims
Wilson has spread anti-vaccine messages, including a claim that vaccines are linked to Alzheimer's disease. She states that her unvaccinated children show up in photos more "light and clear" than vaccinated children. She further claims that the media and pharmaceutical industries are suppressing cancer cures, that 5G technology is a "weapon", and that drug and gambling addiction can be caused by bad spirits.

The Spinoff reported that Wilson's "fixations read like a conspiracy theorist's crib sheet – 5G [conspiracies], anti-vaxx, lab-created virus" as well as her praise of Donald Trump's dealing with such issues.

The Good Thinking Society's project director, Michael Marshall, has expressed concerns that Wilson's shows may discourage people from seeking medical help while "wasting their money," and that her anti-vaccine rhetoric may endanger children. Several venues in the UK cancelled appearances by Wilson after Marshall contacted them about these concerns. The NZ Skeptics made a similar effort to urge venues to cancel Wilson's events during her tour of New Zealand. The chair of the organisation, Craig Shearer, voiced concerns about the risk of participants forgoing medical care and suffering financial exploitation.

After being contacted by Marshall, the UK Advertising Standards Authority cautioned Wilson to, according to Wilson, comply with UK regulations and "remove any claims to work with spirit world doctors, any videos that mention any diseases. I am only able to say that I can give people a feeling of well being."

In June 2020, The Spinoff reported that in an online workshop on May 28, Wilson had made numerous false and unsubstantiated claims on many topics. The workshop had been attended by investigator Susan Gerbic, who recorded the event and notified the publication. Wilson's claims included:
 An unproven dietary supplement, HFI, described as a "soil-based, broad spectrum anti-viral supplement", would prevent COVID-19. She claimed "The virus has to attach to the lungs. The particular COVID attaches to the lungs. And what that product does is it lines the lungs, making it resistant to something attaching. That's the very best preventative I can recommend."
 The use of ventilators for COVID-19 treatment was misguided, and that patients "needed antibiotics" instead.
 The coronavirus was man-made but was accidentally released.
 The coronavirus is going to "miraculously disappear" by the end of 2020 due to mutations.

In the session, Wilson claimed she had been told "what was happening on the planet" and also said that "last May I got a little nudge again to say, 'right, you're activated' … So by December of this year, a lot more is going to be out in the open, a lot more people are going to know exactly what is happening and what's been behind it." She said the revelations will include that "money is being controlled by very few people. There's about 300 people that have basically been in charge of the world. And these people are going to be exposed, and their nefarious doings are being exposed as well. And as that happens, it's not going to be nice but it's going to be for ultimate good. It's like the dark is being exposed to the light." Wilson also said "God created this body with an immune system, so I'm not a believer in vaccines..."

Elsewhere in the video, Wilson defends Donald Trump, saying "He's now my hero. He's one very, very smart man, and he's doing a hell of a lot behind the scenes. He's seen through [infectious diseases expert and coronavirus taskforce member] Anthony Fauci, he's sorted out the World Health Organization, he's stopping the 5G, he's stopping mandatory vaccines, all the key things that need to happen, he's onto it a lot more than most people realise."

Susan Gerbic attended an on-line workshop titled "Connecting with Loved Ones" where Wilson showed photographs that were alleged to have caught images of spirits in them. Paranormal investigator Kenny Biddle examined each photo and was able to offer alternate explanations for each. In a photo depicting the shadowy, transparent legs of a man, that Wilson claimed represented a spirit that needed removing, Biddle described how a long exposure can produce the same results. In an image showing "Two Orbs" that Wilson claimed represented "troublesome spirits", Biddle states they are the result of dust particles floating close to the lens that reflect light from sources such as a flash or sunlight. In a picture that depicted people around a grave drinking beer, there is a fuzzy, white anomaly apparently sitting on the coffin which Wilson states is the soul of the deceased laying on top of the box. Biddle counters this as being either a strand of hair on the photographer's finger or a camera strap that has entered the field of view of the lens. He states that when items fall close to the lens, they will appear washed out, if it is a bright day as was apparent in the photo, and blurry.

Dietary supplements
In July 2020, RNZ reported that Wilson was claiming that a bluetooth device called the Healy Resonance she sells for the starting price of $780 can dose vitamins "vibrationally." In a sales-pitch, Wilson says "This is the best investment you'll probably make your whole life, for what it can do for you and your family". The Consumer NZ head of research said Wilson's claims were "a load of nonsense and unfortunately these kinds of claims are rife and enforcement is lacking which means shonky traders are making advantage of the situation". Physics professor Richard Easther of the University of Auckland says that claims being made about the product are not valid, and that he "wouldn't touch this with a barge pole." A Medsafe spokesman said Healy was being sold by Wilson as a medical device, therefore its promotion via testimonial was not permitted. The statement went on to warn that consumers with serious health conditions should speak to a healthcare professional before buying a device like the Healy.

At her shows, Wilson advertises a dietary supplement, called alfa PXP Royale, made from micronised black rice. The supplement is sold by Enzacta, a multi-level marketing company for which Wilson is a promoter, at a dramatic markup relative to the cost of whole purple rice sold in supermarkets or "micronised purple rice" sold online. The Spinoff reported that Wilson promotes PXP Royale as "the most amazing product on the face of the Earth", and sells jars containing 30 servings at NZD$148 each. Wilson has claimed of PXP, that "You can use it as a preventative or you can keep a jar in the cupboard and then if anybody in the family starts to have symptoms you can introduce it to the diet at that stage." She also suggested, against all evidence, that "the people most at risk [from COVID-19] are obviously the younger people, as in babies and children that haven't got such a robust immune system".

A surgeon interviewed by Australia's A Current Affair television show criticised the marketing of the supplement, stating that customers are "wasting their money, and for this product a large amount of money; and secondly, they may be led to believe they don't need to take their effective treatments for conditions they may actually have." Despite this, Wilson claims that the "purple powder" can help elderly people "keep their vibrations up", and at one performance she invited an audience member to speak with her about the "best thing for scar tissue" off camera, so that "trading standards don't become all uppity."

Aborted political career
On 11 August 2020 Wilson announced she would run for parliament against Prime Minister Jacinda Ardern in the Mount Albert electorate as a candidate of the Public Party in the 2020 New Zealand general election. The Public Party had joined forces (26 July 2020) with Jami-Lee Ross's Advance NZ party, and has labelled COVID-19 a "plandemic". Wilson said "If I'm putting my hat in the ring and going into politics, I'm going to do it with absolute truth and absolute integrity."

In her announcement, Wilson accused Jacinda Ardern of treason, and revealed evidence she said could bring the election to a halt. She questioned the lawfulness of the government, saying "I have found something that is going to challenge our very constitution here, whether our government has the right to make the laws – such as the Covid."

Constitutional lawyer Andrew Geddis, asked for his opinion on Wilson's legal pronouncements, said: "This is meaningless word soup, which takes various events and documents and strings them together in a manner that bears some superficial resemblance to a legal claim but actually is total and utter nonsense ... I'm not going to go through it bit by bit, because it isn't worth the resultant loss of time and braincells ... I'll also note that these kinds of frankly unhinged sorts of claims have been raised before."

Twenty-two hours later Wilson changed her mind and withdrew, saying, "I am guided what to do, we all are, the question is whether we listen ... This morning I was guided to withdraw from being a candidate in the forthcoming election."

Selected publications

See also 
 Energy (healing or psychic or spiritual)
 Taylor Winterstein (fellow PXP promoter)

References 

Living people
English emigrants to New Zealand
New Zealand psychics
Mediumship
Faith healers
Paranormal hoaxes
Vaccine hesitancy
New Zealand conspiracy theorists
Year of birth uncertain
1960s births
COVID-19 conspiracy theorists
5G conspiracy theorists
British anti-vaccination activists